The Hunter was an electoral district of the Legislative Assembly in the Australian state of New South Wales created in 1859 and partly replacing Durham on the Hunter River. It was abolished in 1894.

Members for Hunter

Election results

References

Former electoral districts of New South Wales
1859 establishments in Australia
Constituencies established in 1859
1894 disestablishments in Australia
Constituencies disestablished in 1894